Forests for the 21st Century is a short video promoting and explaining the benefits of forest landscape restoration.  In the last few centuries people have removed more than half of the world's forest cover. Deforestation is currently responsible for nearly 20 per cent of global carbon emissions. This tide of deforestation can be reversed, but we can make a much greater impact if we also put back some of our lost forests.  Planting more trees can lock up more carbon, improve the environment and people's lives. Many regions and countries have already restored much of their forest.

Summary
The film includes examples of successful restoration projects in the UK, at Shinyanga in northern Tanzania and in the Miyun area of China.  New information indicates that there are many millions more hectares of lost forests and degraded lands that are suitable for restoration than previously estimated. The extent of global opportunities for forest restoration is illustrated in the video for the very first time.

The 15 minute film was produced in November 2009 by the Forestry Commission of Great Britain and the IUCN on behalf of the Global Partnership on Forest Landscape Restoration.

References

External links

Reforestation
Ecological restoration
Documentary films about forests and trees
Sponsored films
2009 films
British documentary films
Direct-to-video documentary films
2000s British films